The Gran Premio della Costa Etruschi is a one-day professional cycling race between the towns of San Vincenzo and Donoratico on the Tuscany coast in Italy. The 193 kilometre long race takes place at the beginning of February and has now taken over from the Trofeo Laigueglia as the opening event of the Italian professional cycling season. It is ranked 1.1 on the UCI Europe Tour. The race has been dominated by Italians since its inception in 1996, with riders from that nation winning on 17 occasions, with an all Italian 1-2-3 happening 14 times out of the 21 editions of the race.

History
The Gran Premio della Costa Etruschi is a relatively new race by European cycling standards, coming into being in 1996. For the first six years of its existence it only carried the grading of a national event and was not included on the UCI calendar nor did it carry any ranking points. It was not until 2002 that it was included on the UCI calendar with a ranking of 1.3. Despite its lack of official status in its early days the race always drew a top class field composed of mostly Italian teams and continues to do so . The race came of age in 1998 when 25,000 people saw Tuscan sprinting ace Mario Cipollini win the race, the first of his two victories (he won also in 2000). Ukrainian rider Yuriy Metlushenko has also taken two victories in the event (in 2002 and 2004), however the record for the most victories in the race stands with Alessandro Petacchi who posted five victories in the six editions of the race between 2005 and 2010. His third victory in 2007 was his first pro victory for nine months after breaking his kneecap in the Giro d’Italia in May 2006.

The 2013 edition was originally cancelled due to financial problems; however, on 12 March 2013, during the presentation of the Settimana Internazionale Coppi e Bartali, the mayor of Castagneto Carducci announced that the Gran Premio Costa degli Etruschi would be raced on 21 September, as a preparation race for the 2013 UCI Road World Championships in Florence.

The course
The race was originally over a distance of 153 kilometres but this has increased over the years to its present length of around 190 km. The course is relatively level and definitely favours the sprinters. The first 30 kilometres are perfectly flat as the race leaves San Vincenzo and goes north along the coast to the town of Cecina. Here it swings inland and takes in two ascents of the modest 275 metre climb of the  Guardistallo (the highest point of the course) after 39 and 79 kilometres. The second part of the race consists of two laps of a 24.3 kilometre circuit followed by five laps of a 10.15 circuit. Both these circuits are comparatively flat and are based around the finishing town of Donoratico where the race finishes on the Via Aurelia.

Past results

Winners by Nationality

References

External links
 Official Website

 
Cycle races in Italy
UCI Europe Tour races
Recurring sporting events established in 1996
1996 establishments in Italy